Albert Green Wilder (April 14, 1939 – December 5, 2012) was a professional American football player who played defensive tackle and defensive end for four seasons for the New York Jets in the American Football League.

References

1939 births
2012 deaths
Players of American football from Greensboro, North Carolina
American football defensive tackles
American football defensive ends
NC State Wolfpack football players
New York Jets players
American Football League players
Grimsley High School alumni